Douglas Robert "Doug" Parnham (born 23 July 1951) is a British sprint canoer who competed from the early 1970s to the early 1980s. Competing in three Summer Olympics, he earned his best finish of seventh in the K-1 1000 m event at Montreal in 1976. He then went on to coach rowing, as of 2018, he coaches Emanuel School Boat Club.

References
 

1951 births
Canoeists at the 1972 Summer Olympics
Canoeists at the 1976 Summer Olympics
Canoeists at the 1980 Summer Olympics
Living people
Olympic canoeists of Great Britain
British male canoeists